Epepeotes is a genus of flat-faced longhorns beetle belonging to the family Cerambycidae, subfamily Lamiinae.

List of species
Epepeotes ambigenus (Chevrolat, 1841)
Epepeotes andamanicus Gahan, 1893
Epepeotes basigranatus (Fairmaire, 1883)
Epepeotes birmanus Breuning, 1969
Epepeotes ceramensis (Thomson, 1860)
Epepeotes commixtus (Pascoe, 1859)
Epepeotes desertus (Linnaeus, 1758)
Epepeotes diversus Pascoe, 1866
Epepeotes elongatus Hüdepohl, 1990
Epepeotes fimbriatus Olivier, 1792
Epepeotes gardneri Breuning, 1936
Epepeotes himalayanus Breuning, 1950
Epepeotes indistinctus Breuning, 1938
Epepeotes integripennis Breuning, 1940
Epepeotes jeanvoinei Pic, 1935
Epepeotes laosicus Breuning, 1964
Epepeotes lateralis (Guérin-Méneville, 1831)
Epepeotes lugubris (Pascoe, 1866)
Epepeotes luscus (Fabricius, 1787)
Epepeotes meleagris (Pascoe, 1866)
Epepeotes nicobaricus Breuning, 1960
Epepeotes nitidus (Aurivillius, 1923)
Epepeotes pictus Breuning, 1938
Epepeotes plorator (Newman, 1842)
Epepeotes schlegelii Lansberge, 1884
Epepeotes strandi (Breuning, 1935)
Epepeotes taeniotinus Heller, 1924
Epepeotes timorensis Breuning, 1950
Epepeotes uncinatus Gahan, 1888
Epepeotes vestigialis Pascoe, 1866

References
 Biolib

 
Lamiini
Taxa named by Francis Polkinghorne Pascoe